Gaan Bangla, also known by the GB acronym, is a Bangladeshi Bengali-language music television channel owned by One More Zero Group. It was launched on 13 January 2013, and, at launch, was Bangladesh's second music oriented television channel after Channel 16, but after its closure, Gaan Bangla became the country's sole music channel. The channel is based in Baridhara, Dhaka.

Wind of Change 

Gaan Bangla is most famous for the Wind of Change series, which debuted in 2016. It showcases local and international musicians performing together, with music composed by Taposh. The series featured famous Bangladeshi artists.

History

In October 2011, the Bangladesh Telecommunication Regulatory Commission granted "Gaan Bangla TV" a license to broadcast. The channel began transmissions as Gaan Bangla on 16 December 2013 as Bangladesh's first music-oriented television channel broadcasting in high definition, with its prime focus on redefining the standards of music video production. As a high definition television channel, artists and video creators alike were inspired to start creating high definition content to be recognized through the only contemporary Bangladeshi channel dedicated to music.

By the end of 2014 Gaan Bangla established itself as the benchmark of musical presentations through various renowned artists enlisting and submitting their content on the channel. In the meantime, to help boost the struggling talented musicians, Gaan Bangla started investing in music content for artists in collaboration with its sister concern - TM Production of OMZ Group. This redefined Gaan Bangla as not just a dedicated music channel but a platform that was establishing itself to stand as the backbone of the Bangladeshi Music Industry.  By the time the channel celebrated its first birthday, celebrities, artists, social figures from all sectors were on board with full support to help push the Gaan Bangla movement forward.

Through 2015, Gaan Bangla continued to enhance and expand its reach not just in Bangladesh but around the world through various digital platforms and started becoming a household name in the global Bengali community. The Channel also started to focus on hunting for talented musicians around the country and bringing them to the forefront. As time went by, Gaan Bangla was not just showcasing stars of the music & film industry; it was creating them.

In July 2016, Gaan Bangla premiered its first self-produced musical series titled Wind of Change, which was believed to have revolutionized television music shows in Bangladesh. Wind of Change featured popular Bangladeshi artists such as Ayub Bachchu, Miles (band), and more. It presented new renditions of Bengali songs in collaboration with international instrumentalists. At the same time, staying true to its nature, Gaan Bangla shed light on the unsung talents and the country was introduced to 'Behaya Mon' by Chisty Baul. This was the beginning of a worldwide movement of spreading the energy and message of peace, love and unity through music under the tagline 'Music For Peace'.

2017-2020 ( Wind of Change Expansion ) saw Gaan Bangla expanding its network internationally through bridging various links to ensure it is available to the Bengali communities around the world. At the same time, through the launch of Six Wind of Change Seasons, Gaan Bangla has dived deeper into the international ocean of musicians, finding maestros across the globe and connecting them to Bangladesh and its music.

Leadership
Farzana Munny is the chairperson of Gaan Bangla Television & Kaushik Hossain Taposh is the Managing Director & CEO of the Channel.

References

External links
 
 
 

Television channels in Bangladesh
Mass media in Dhaka
Television channels and stations established in 2013
2013 establishments in Bangladesh